Hygeia House can refer to:
 Hygeia House (Cheltenham), 1801, one of the first important houses to be built in the Georgian and Regency expansion of Cheltenham
 Hygeia House (Rhode Island), 1885
 Hygeia Hotel at Fort Monroe in Hampton, Virginia, 1882
 Hygeia (city), a proposed utopian city of 1827, on the same principles.